Go, Johnny, Go! is a 1959 rock and roll film starring Alan Freed as a talent scout searching for a future rock and roll star. Co-starring in the film are Jimmy Clanton, Sandy Stewart, and Chuck Berry. The film has also been released as Johnny Melody, The Swinging Story and The Swinging Story of Johnny Melody.

Plot summary

Chuck Berry performs "Johnny B. Goode" over the opening titles.  We meet a young singer (Jimmy Clanton) who goes by the stage name of Johnny Melody. After a few opening performances, Berry and Alan Freed (playing themselves) discuss their discovery of Johnny, whose fate once hinged on the toss of a coin, with Freed intimating that Johnny nearly ended-up in jail. Berry demands to know the rest of the story.

Alan relates that Johnny was once a choir boy from an orphanage. After a practice, the choir director expresses his contempt for rock and roll and leaves.  A moment later, he returns to find the kids performing "Ship On A Stormy Sea" with Johnny, who has no last name, in the lead.  He stops the song and says that he'll call the other kids' parents, but since Johnny has no parents, he is dismissed and will be sent back to the orphanage.  Instead, he gets a job as an usher in a theater, but is fired on his first day for dancing in the aisle to Jo Ann Campbell's "Mama Can I Go Out".  During the performance, Alan freed announces a talent search for a singer to be renamed "Johnny Melody".

At the theater door, Johnny meets his old friend from the orphanage, Julie Arnold (Sandy Stewart). She wants him to call her to re-connect, but he tells her he has no money for dates and is saving to record a demo record.  Freed then tells Johnny that the talent search was only a publicity stunt by his agent.

At a recording studio, Julie records a demo of "Playmates".  On her way out, she meets Johnny again, and sings back-up on his recording of "My Love Is Strong". The record is one of many sent to Freed, but Berry, hearing something special in it, urges that it be given strong consideration. But Johnny has failed to include contact information, and his subsequent call to Freed's office fails to get through.

Johnny and Julie begin to fall in love, and he wants to get her a special pin for Christmas. After pawning his trumpet, he still doesn't have enough, and he determines to break the jewelry store window with a brick. In the meantime, Freed has begun playing Johnny's record on his radio show to overwhelming response, and has started a public search for Johnny.  After hearing the show, Julie rouses Freed and they trail Johnny to the area of the jewelry store, at one point flipping a coin to decide in which direction to look. They find Johnny just as he throws the brick.  Freed sends Johnny away with Julie and diverts the police by pretending to be a drunk who tossed the brick.

This brings us back to present, and Johnny and Julie are married.

Cast

 Alan Freed as himself
 Jimmy Clanton as Johnny Melody
 Sandy Stewart as Julie Arnold
 Chuck Berry as himself
 Herb Vigran as Bill Barnett
 Frank Wilcox as Mr. Arnold
 Barbara Wooddell as Mrs. Arnold

 Ritchie Valens as himself
 Eddie Cochran as himself
 Jackie Wilson as himself
 Milton Frome as Mr. Martin
 Adriano Celentano as himself (Italian version)
 Piero Vivarelli as TV director (Italian version)
 Joe Cranston as Band leader

 Martha Wentworth as Mrs. McGillacudy, Johnny's landlady
 Robert Foulk as Policeman at jewelry store
 Phil Arnold as Stagehand
 William Fawcett as Janitor at radio station
 Dick Elliott as Man waiting for the telephone
 Inga Boling as Secretary
 Joe Flynn as Usher who fires Johnny

Jazz legend Dave Brubeck appears uncredited as the piano player backing Chuck Berry when he sings "Little Queenie".

Cast notes
 Jimmy Clanton' was involved in the music scene of New Orleans. The first single he released, "Just a Dream", was recorded with the assistance of studio musicians such as Mac Rebennack ("Dr. John, the Night Tripper") and Allen Toussaint. Rebennack would have a top 10 hit on the Billboard charts with "Right Place, Wrong Time" in 1973. The recording session for "Just a Dream" was among the early sessions that Toussaint participated\.
 Go, Johnny Go! was the only film appearance of Ritchie Valens, who died shortly after filming it in a plane crash, along with Buddy Holly and The Big Bopper. The film was released after Valens' death.
 Go, Johnny Go! was Eddie Cochran's third and final appearance in a major picture. A second song, "I Remember", was filmed but cut from the final print.

Songs

 "Go, Johnny Go!" (Johnny B. Goode) – Chuck Berry
 "I'll Take A Long Time" – Jimmy Clanton
 "Jump Children" – The Flamingos
 "Angel Face" – Jimmy Clanton
 "Don't Be Afraid To Love" – Harvey
 "Mama Can I Go Out" – Jo Ann Campbell
 "Teenage Heaven" – Eddie Cochran
 "Playmates" – Sandy Stewart
 "My Love Is Strong" – Jimmy Clanton
 "Memphis, Tennessee" – Chuck Berry
 "Jay Walker" – The Cadillacs
 "You Better Know It" – Jackie Wilson
 "Please Mr. Johnson" – The Cadillacs
 "Heavenly Father" – Sandy Stewart
 "Little Queenie" – Chuck Berry
 "Ooh My Head" – Ritchie Valens
 "Ship On A Stormy Sea" – Jimmy Clanton

Production
Go, Johnny Go! was filmed in 1-week over five days starting Monday morning January 5, 1959, at the Culver City, California studios of Hal Roach Productions.

References
Notes

External links
 
 
 
 

1959 films
Italian musical comedy films
1959 musical comedy films
American black-and-white films
Italian black-and-white films
Films directed by Piero Vivarelli
Rockabilly songs
1950s Italian-language films
Publicity stunts in fiction
American musical comedy films
1950s English-language films
1950s American films
1950s Italian films